Meliteas Meliti Football Club is a Greek football club, based in Meliti, Florina, Greece.

Honours

Domestic

 Florina FCA champion: 3
 1998–99, 2002–03, 2017–18
 Florina FCA Cup Winners: 3
 2003–04, 2011–12, 2018–19

References

Football clubs in Western Macedonia
Florina (regional unit)
Association football clubs established in 1957
1957 establishments in Greece
Gamma Ethniki clubs